Antonin Naçi (born 12 October 1953) is an Albanian footballer. He played in one match for the Albania national football team in 1976.

References

External links
 

1953 births
Living people
Albanian footballers
Albania international footballers
Place of birth missing (living people)
Association footballers not categorized by position